Shawn Powers (born 19 July 1975) is a journalist, Open Source evangelist, cartoonist, and online personality. He is currently a co-host at FLOSS Weekly.. on the TWiT.tv network, a frequent guest host on the Reality 2.0 podcast, and an active blogger since 2006. Specializing in Linux, he is best known for his time as Associate Editor and columnist for Linux Journal from 2007 until its buyout in 2019. His first article, Build Your Own Arcade Game Player and Relive the '80s! was featured on the 2007 cover of Linux Journal. Powers became an editor of the magazine shortly thereafter, writing the monthly Current_Issue.tar.gz and UpFront columns and answering letters to the editor. He was also the main personality on the Linux Journal YouTube channel, and still creates content on his own channel.

Career
Powers' professional careers have focused on education. From 2000-2012, he was the Technology Director at Inland Lakes Schools in Indian River, Michigan. Then from 2012-2013 he was Assistant Director of Database Services at Cornerstone University in Grand Rapids, Michigan. In addition, he has been a Linux and Open Source trainer for CBT Nuggets from 2009 until present day.

He has spoken at multiple conferences, including Southern California Linux Expo (SCaLE), Penguicon, Michigan Association for Educational Data Systems (MAEDS), and was keynote speaker at Ohio Linuxfest 2009.

His online comic, MyBigRoundWorld has been active since 2021 

https://www.reality2cast.com/65.

Life
Powers spent his early years living in Detroit, MI. His family moved to northern Michigan in the late 80s, and he graduated from Cheboygan High School in 1993. He received several scholarships to attend Michigan Technological University, and worked toward an Electrical Engineering degree until he dropped out in 1995 to pursue computer networking. That year, he married Donna Powers (née Croft). They have 3 adult children, and currently live in Petoskey, MI.

Of note, in March of 1999, Shawn had a car accident which caused complete amnesia, which continues to present day. He's given several talks, and been interviewed on multiple occasions about amnesia and closed head injuries.

In January 2010 Powers' house caught fire and was a complete loss. Shawn, his wife Donna, and their three girls escaped unharmed, but their pets were lost.

References

External links
 
 My Big Round World comic

1975 births
Living people
Journalists from Michigan
American evangelists
American cartoonists
American Internet celebrities